Selšček is a settlement immediately east of Begunje pri Cerknici in the Municipality of Cerknica in the Inner Carniola region of Slovenia.

Geography
Selšček is a ribbon village on the Menišija Plateau. It lies along the road from Begunje pri Cerknici to Topol pri Begunjah on the southern slope of Bare Peak (815 m). The Logi Meadow in the village is flood-prone.

Name
Selšček was mentioned in written sources 1260 as Celsach (and as Solzach in 1275, Zelskach in 1285, Shelsach in 1321, Selsacz in 1338, Selczak in 1345, Elsach in 1367, Zelsach in 1379, and Seltschach in 1444). In the past the German name was Seuschtschek.

History
Selšček was recorded in the 13th century as a property of the Carthusian monastery in Bistra. Water mains were installed in the village in 1892, connected to springs with catchment basins below Stražišče Hill (954 m) north of the settlement.

Church

The local church in Selšček is dedicated to the Elevation of the Holy Cross. It is a chapel of ease belonging to the Parish of Begunje pri Cerknici.

Notable people
Notable people that were born in Selšček include:
Anton Gaspari (1895–1985), children's writer and poet
Maksim Gaspari (1883–1980), painter and illustrator

Gallery

References

External links

Selšček on Geopedia

Populated places in the Municipality of Cerknica